Daloa Airport  is an airport serving Daloa, Côte d'Ivoire.

See also
Transport in Côte d'Ivoire

References

 OurAirports - Daloa
   Great Circle Mapper - Daloa
 Google Earth

Airports in Ivory Coast
Buildings and structures in Sassandra-Marahoué District
Daloa